Cotoneaster granatensis is a species of flowering plant in the family Rosaceae that can be found in Algeria, Morocco, Spain and Tunisia. It was described in 1836.

Description

References

granatensis
Flora of Algeria
Flora of Morocco
Flora of Spain
Flora of Tunisia
Near threatened plants
Near threatened flora of Africa
Near threatened biota of Europe
Plants described in 1836
Taxa named by Pierre Edmond Boissier